"Faces of Evil" is a DC Comics "event" in January 2009, that editor Dan DiDio described as "inspirationally tied to Final Crisis," with focus placed on the villains of the particular titles involved in and associated with the event. Numerous monthly books had villains displayed on their covers while four additional one-shots were published.

Titles

The full list of issues is:

The kids-friendly book Tiny Titans also featured a "Faces of Mischief" issue around the same time, written by Art Baltazar and Franco Aureliani, and illustrated by Art Baltazar.

The issues of Superman and Action Comics are epilogues to the Superman: New Krypton crossover series. Nightwing is a continuation of the "Batman R.I.P." aftermath storyline, "Last Rites".  Detective Comics and Batman comprise a self-contained storyline dependent on each other.

The Faces of Evil event continued in the storyline "Deathtrap", that focuses on Jericho, which starts in Teen Titans Annual 2009, and then carries on in a crossover between Teen Titans #70-71, Titans #12-13 and Vigilante #5.

A seven-part Solomon Grundy miniseries, by Johns and Kolins, picked up where Faces of Evil: Grundy left off.

Notes

References
 DC Comics January 2009 titles

External links
 Faces of Evil at the DC Database Project